This article shows statistics of the club's players in the season, and also lists all matches that the club played in the 2008 season.

Players
Summer and winter transfers correspond to Southern Hemisphere seasons.

Squad information
The following table shows only appearances and goals made this season.

In/out

In

Out

Goalscorers

Matches

Competitive

Copa Sudamericana

Torneo Descentralizado

Torneo Apertura

Torneo Clausura

Friendly

2008
Universitario De Deportes